The 2022–23 season is the 145th in the existence of Wolverhampton Wanderers Football Club and the club's fifth consecutive in the Premier League. In addition to the league, they also competed in the FA Cup and the EFL Cup.

Transfers

In

Out

Loans in

Loans out

New and extended contracts

Pre-season and friendlies
On 15 June, Wolves announced a pre-season training camp in Alicante, which includes two friendlies against Beşiktaş and Alavés. A double header in Algarve, against Sporting CP and Farense was later added. A behind-closed-doors match against Villarreal B was scheduled to conclude to team's trip to Alicante.

Winter friendlies

Due to the 2022 FIFA World Cup taking place during the winter, Premier League and any cup competition fixtures were put on hold. Wolves last game before the tournament hosted in Qatar was a home fixture against Arsenal on the 12 November 2022 in the Premier League, and their returning fixture was against Gillingham on the 20 December 2022 in the fourth round of the EFL Cup. During this period of time Wolves would play a selection of friendly games. The first being against Birmingham City on 3 December 2022, which would then be followed by a 10 day trip to Marbella, where they faced Empoli on the 9 December 2022 and Cádiz on the 14 December 2022.

Competitions

Overall record

Premier League

League table

Results summary

Results by round

Matches

On 16 June, the Premier League fixtures were released.

FA Cup

The club entered the FA Cup at the third round stage and were drawn away to Liverpool.

EFL Cup

Wolves entered the competition in the second round and were drawn at home against Preston North End. Wolves were drawn against fellow Premier League side Leeds United in the third round. In the fourth round another home tie was given against Gillingham. An away trip against Nottingham Forest was drawn for the quarter-final stage.

EFL Trophy

Wolves were one of the sixteen teams from outside the bottom two divisions of the English Football League to be invited to field their academy team in the competition due to it holding Category 1 academy status. They were drawn into Group C in the Northern section. Note: In group stage matches which are level at the end of 90 minutes, a penalty shoot-out will be held, with the winner earning a bonus point.
Wolves were placed in Draw B of the Northern section of the round of 32 draw. They were drawn away to Manchester United U21. Due to the rescheduled 2021 Men's and Women's Rugby League World Cup finals taking place at Old Trafford 3 days prior, it was agreed between the EFL and both clubs that the tie will be played at Molineux.

Group table

Matches

Players

Statistics

|-
|align="left"|||align="left"|||align="left"| 
|||0||||0||2||0||||0||0||0||
|-
|align="left"|||align="left"|||align="left"|  ¤
|||0||||0||0||0||||0||0||0||
|-
|align="left"|||align="left"|||align="left"|  
|||1||||0||3(1)||1||||2||4||0||
|-
|align="left"|||align="left"|||align="left"|  
|||0||||0||3||0||style="background:#98FB98"|||0||2||1||
|-
|align="left"|||align="left"|||align="left"| 
|||0||||0||0||0||style="background:#98FB98"|||0||2||1||
|-
|align="left"|||align="left"|||align="left"|  ¤
|||0||||0||0||0||||0||0||0||
|-
|align="left"|||align="left"|||style="background:#faecc8; text-align:left;"|  ‡
|||0||||0||0(1)||1||style="background:#98FB98"|||1||2||0||
|-
|align="left"|||align="left"|||align="left"| 
|||0||||0||0(1)||0||||0||1||0||
|-
|align="left"|||align="left"|||align="left"|  
|||5||||0||2(2)||0||||5||10||0||
|-
|align="left"|||align="left"|||align="left"| 
|||0||||0||2(1)||3||||3||0||0||
|-
|align="left"|10||align="left"|||align="left"|  
|||5||||0||1(3)||0||||5||6||0||
|-
|align="left"|11||align="left"|||align="left"| 
|||1||||1||3(1)||0||||2||1||0||
|-
|align="left"|12||align="left"|||style="background:#faecc8; text-align:left;"|  ‡
|||1||||0||0(1)||0||style="background:#98FB98"|||1||0||0||
|-
|align="left"|13||align="left"|||align="left"|  ¤
|||0||||0||2||0||style="background:#98FB98"|||0||0||0||
|-
|align="left"|14||align="left"|||align="left"|  ¤
|||0||||0||0||0||||0||0||0||
|-
|align="left"|15||align="left"|||align="left"|  †
|||0||||0||0||0||||0||0||0||
|-
|align="left"|15||align="left"|||align="left"| 
|||1||||0||0||0||style="background:#98FB98"|||1||2||0||
|-
|align="left"|16||align="left"|||align="left"|  ¤
|||0||||0||0||0||||0||0||0||
|-
|align="left"|17||align="left"|||align="left"|  ¤
|||1||||1||3(1)||0||style="background:#98FB98"|||2||1||0||
|-
|align="left"|18||align="left"|||align="left"|  †
|||0||||0||0||0||||0||1||0||
|-
|align="left"|18||align="left"|||align="left"| 
|||0||||0||0||0||style="background:#98FB98"|||0||0||0||
|-
|align="left"|19||align="left"|||align="left"| 
|||1||||0||2(1)||0||||1||4||1||
|-
|align="left"|20||align="left"|||align="left"| 
|||0||||0||0||0||||0||0||0||
|-
|align="left"|21||align="left"|||align="left"|  ¤
|||0||||0||0||0||||0||0||0||
|-
|align="left"|21||align="left"|||align="left"| 
|||1||||0||0||0||style="background:#98FB98"|||1||2||0||
|-
|align="left"|22||align="left"|||align="left"|  
|||0||||0||3||0||||0||8||1||
|-
|align="left"|23||align="left"|||align="left"|  
|||0||||0||4||0||||0||4||0||
|-
|align="left"|24||align="left"|||align="left"| 
|||0||||0||1||0||||0||2||0||
|-
|align="left"|25||align="left"|||align="left"|  †
|||0||||0||1||0||||0||0||0||
|-
|align="left"|25||align="left"|||align="left"| 
|||0||||0||0||0||||0||0||0||
|-
|align="left"|27||align="left"|||align="left"| 
|||0||||0||2(1)||0||style="background:#98FB98"|||0||2||1||
|-
|align="left"|28||align="left"|||align="left"| 
|||0||||0||3(1)||0||||0||2||0||
|-
|align="left"|29||align="left"|||align="left"| 
|||0||||0||1||0||style="background:#98FB98"|||0||2||1||
|-
|align="left"|30||align="left"|||align="left"|  †
|||0||||0||0||0||||0||0||0||
|-
|align="left"|32||align="left"|||align="left"|  †
|||0||||0||1||0||||0||0||0||
|-
|align="left"|33||align="left"|||align="left"|  ¤
|||0||||0||0||0||||0||0||0||
|-
|align="left"|34||align="left"|||align="left"|  ¤
|||0||||0||0||0||||0||0||0||
|-
|align="left"|35||align="left"|||align="left"| 
|||1||||0||0||0||style="background:#98FB98"|||1||2||0||
|-
|align="left"|37||align="left"|||align="left"| 
|||2||||0||2(2)||1||||3||1||0||
|-
|align="left"|39||align="left"|||align="left"|  ¤
|||0||||0||0||0||||0||0||0||
|-
|align="left"|40||align="left"|||align="left"|  ¤
|||0||||0||0||0||||0||0||0||
|-
|align="left"|55||align="left"|||align="left"|  ¤
|||0||||0||0||0||||0||0||0||
|-
|align="left"|59||align="left"|||align="left"| 
|||0||||0||2(1)||0||style="background:#98FB98"|||0||1||0||
|-
|align="left"|62||align="left"|||align="left"|  †
|||0||||0||0||0||||0||0||0||
|-
|align="left"|63||align="left"|||align="left"| 
|||0||||0||0||0||||0||0||0||
|-
|align="left"|64||align="left"|||align="left"| 
|||0||||0||1||0||style="background:#98FB98"|||0||1||0||
|-
|align="left"|66||align="left"|||align="left"| 
|||0||||0||0||0||||0||0||0||
|-
|align="left"|77||align="left"|||align="left"| 
|||0||||0||0(1)||0||||0||0||0||
|-
|align="left"|81||align="left"|||align="left"| 
|||0||||0||0(1)||0||style="background:#98FB98"|||0||0||0||
|-
|}

Club awards

Player of the Month award 
Voted for by fans on Wolverhampton Wanderers' official website.

References

Wolverhampton Wanderers
Wolverhampton Wanderers F.C. seasons